Dębostrów  (formerly ) is a village in the administrative district of Gmina Police, within Police County, West Pomeranian Voivodeship, in north-western Poland, close to the German border. 

Tourism 
 There is a bicycle trail (red  Trail "Puszcza Wkrzańska"-Szlak "Puszcza Wkrzańska")  in an area of Dębostrów in Wkrzanska Forest.

See also 

 Police
 Szczecin

References

Villages in Police County